is a 1963 color (Eastmancolor) Japanese adventure film directed by Kon Ichikawa. It was entered into the 1964 Cannes Film Festival. The film is based on the book , Kenichi Horie's account of his 1962 solo voyage across the Pacific, which was the first successful Transpacific solo voyage.

Plot
Yujiro Ishihara is a young yachtsman who impulsively decides to sail across the Pacific Ocean to San Francisco. On the way he encounters a ship with American passengers. He talks to them in broken English and realises that he does not have a passport. On landing in San Francisco, he receives a hero's welcome, but is scolded by the Japanese consulate.

Cast
 Yujiro Ishihara as The Youth
 Masayuki Mori as Youth's Father
 Kinuyo Tanaka as Youth's Mother
 Ruriko Asaoka as Youth's Sister
 Hajime Hana as Youth's Friend
 Gannosuke Ashiya
 Kojiro Kusanagi

References

External links
 Alone Across the Pacific at Masters of Cinema
 

1963 films
1963 adventure films
1960s Japanese-language films
Films directed by Kon Ichikawa
Films scored by Yasushi Akutagawa
Films scored by Toru Takemitsu
Films with screenplays by Natto Wada
Japanese adventure films
1960s Japanese films